Displaced aggression, also referred to as redirected aggression, occurs when an animal or human is fearful or agitated by external stimuli, a provocation, or perception, but is unable or unwilling to direct their aggression toward the stimulus. The aggressor may direct aggression toward whoever is nearest. The behavior is more common in cats than it is in dogs. In certain species of monkeys anger is redirected toward a relative or friend of an opponent. In cichlid fish, it may be used to manage conflict within the group. Displaced aggression is experienced by humans and animals.

Cats
Redirected aggression is a common form of aggression which can occur in multiple cat households. Usually there is some stimulus that agitates: this could be a sight, sound, or another source of stimuli which causes a heightened level of anxiety or arousal. If the cat cannot attack the stimulus, it may direct anger elsewhere by attacking or directing aggression to the nearest cat, dog, human or other being. Redirected aggression is more common in cats than it is in dogs.

Dogs 
Aggressive behavior in dogs is often rooted in fear. It is thought that a dog may go into a state of self-protection when it feels threatened. Some dogs may also become overstimulated or feel frustrated when they cannot get to the stimuli, which causes anxiety or fear. The dog may divert their anger toward their owner in what is referred to as a redirected bite.

In some cases, dogs may be frustrated by being unable to go after prey, and they turn on the owner in what is redirected aggression. One woman, Bethany Lynn Stephens, was killed by her own two dogs; the incident has been referred to as a possible case of dogs redirecting aggression.

Elephants
Some solitary adolescent male elephants (10 to 15 years old) were observed bashing vegetation or charging other non-threatening animals in what is thought to be a form of redirected aggression.

Monkeys
The behavior has also been observed in monkeys of the rhesus macaques (Macaca mulatta) and vervet and yellow baboon (Papio cynocephalus) species. In the case of the rhesus macaques, and vervets, the redirected anger is not toward a random monkey, it is toward a relative of the monkey's opponent. In yellow baboons the redirected anger was toward the rival baboon's friends. Yellow baboons are known to form long term friendships.

Cichlid fish
The behavior has been observed in cichlid fish Julidochromis regani, which is considered a social fish living in groups. Observing the fish, researchers noted that after an attack the target fish redirected aggression toward a third party fish, diverting the aggressor's attention toward the third party. This behavior was observed in the females of the species. The researchers also noted that the redirected aggression did not delay aggression from the original aggressor. Their conclusion was that redirected aggression is used to manage conflict in social fish.

People
Displaced aggression is not only experienced by animals; it is also experienced by humans. It may also take the form of scapegoating. Much like redirected aggression in animals a target of aggression or provocation directs their anger at a third party. Usually this is because it is either not possible or perhaps unwise to return or direct aggression to the original source of provocation. In example, a victim attacks an uninvolved third party who had little to do with the victimization. Often the target of redirected aggression is a weaker or smaller person. 

Displaced aggression can take the form of domestic violence. In the United States, ten million people per year—one in three women and one in ten men 18 years of age or older—experience domestic violence. 

Road rage is another example of displaced aggression; the American Psychological Association states that factors such as crowded roads can boost anger behind the wheel causing displaced anger. Traffic on the roads can cause people to take their aggression out on uninvolved drivers. Year over year there is a seven percent increase on reported cases of road rage in the United States. Frustrated or impatient drivers operate recklessly by speeding and cutting off drivers.

In the case of human groups or communities the aggression may be directed at a local minority population. This behavior has been observed in redirected aggression toward immigrants in the form of xenophobia. The term scapegoating is occasionally used to describe this phenomenon.

Strategies
The agitated animal must be avoided until it is no longer angry. Humans should avoid getting involved by interfering in fights or using physical punishment as a corrective tool. The person may be considered the threat in those scenarios. The animal's access to whatever the stimulus was should be restricted.

See also 
 Kick the cat

References

Aggression
Problem behavior
Dispute resolution
Symptoms and signs of mental disorders
Violence